Flavobacterium aquicola  is a Gram-negative, facultatively anaerobic and non-spore-forming bacterium from the genus of Flavobacterium which has been isolated from water from the Tamagawa River in Atsugi in Japan.

References

External links
Type strain of Flavobacterium aquicola at BacDive -  the Bacterial Diversity Metadatabase

 

aquicola
Bacteria described in 2016